This is a list of rivers in Bhutan, all rivers in Bhutan ultimately drain to the Brahmaputra River in India.

Western Bhutan
Jaldhaka River or Di Chu
Amo Chhu or Torsa
Wong Chhu or Raidak
Ha Chhu
Paro Chhu
Thimphu Chhu/Wang Chhu
Puna Tshang Chhu or Sankosh River

Pho Chhu
Mo Chhu
Tang Chuu.

Eastern Bhutan

Manas River
Mangde Chhu or Tongsa  
Bumthang River or Murchangphy Chhu
Drangme Chhu (sometimes considered part of the Manas River)
Kuru Chhu or Lhobrak
Kulong Chhu
Womina Chhu
Tawang Chhu or Gamri
Pagladiya River
Puthimari Nadi
Dhansiri Nadi

References

Bhutan
Rivers